"Thank God for Kids" is a song written by Eddy Raven. It was released as the b-side to his 1976 single "The Curse of a Woman". It was later included on the 1984 MCA Records album of the same name.

It was later recorded by American country music band The Oak Ridge Boys, whose version was the only single from their 1982 Christmas album. The song spent sixteen weeks on the Hot Country Songs charts and peaked at number three.

In 2004, Kenny Chesney covered the song for his Christmas album All I Want for Christmas Is a Real Good Tan. His version spent one week at number 60 on the country singles charts in January 2004.  In 2011, John Rich covered the song for his extended play, For the Kids.

Content
The song is about the relationship between a father and a child. According to Eddy Raven, he wrote it in 1973 after his son said that he wanted to help his father write a song about Mickey Mouse or Big Bird; both characters are referenced in the song ("We'd all live in a quiet house/Without Big Bird or Mickey Mouse...").

Chart performance

The Oak Ridge Boys

Kenny Chesney

References

Eddy Raven songs
The Oak Ridge Boys songs
Kenny Chesney songs
1982 singles
2004 singles
American Christmas songs
Songs about parenthood
Songs written by Eddy Raven
Song recordings produced by Ron Chancey
MCA Records singles
1972 songs
Songs about children